Eccles United Football Club, previously known as Eccles Borough, is an English football club based in Eccles, Greater Manchester, England, which participated in the FA Cup.

References

Defunct football clubs in England
Eccles, Greater Manchester
Defunct football clubs in Greater Manchester
Cheshire County League clubs